Conyers Darcy, 1st Earl of Holderness (24 January 1598/1599 – 14 June 1689) was a British noble; created Earl of Holderness in 1682.

Personal life
Darcy was born the son of Conyers Darcy, 7th Baron Darcy de Knayth and Dorothy Belasyse. He was baptised on 24 Jan 1598/1599 at Kirkby Fleetham, co York (IGI Batch P015071 "Parish register transcripts, 1591-1812" Church of England. Parish Church of Kirkby-Fleetham, Yorkshire).

He married Grace Rokeby, daughter of Thomas Rokeby, on 14 October 1616. He succeeded to the titles of Baron Darcy de Knayth, Baron Conyers and Baron Darcy of Meinhill upon his father's death in 1654. He was created 1st Earl of Holderness on 5 December 1682.

Lord Holderness had two children:
Conyers Darcy, 2nd Earl of Holderness (c. 1621/1622-13 December 1692)
Grace Darcy (c. 1633-1658); married Sir John Legard, 1st Baronet

References

|-

1590s births
1689 deaths
16th-century English people
17th-century English nobility
Earls of Holderness
Barons Darcy de Knayth
Barons Conyers